Stone Giant is a hard rock band formed in 2013  at Boston Massachusetts Berklee College of Music. The band consists of singer and guitarist Bluhauz, keyboardist João Nogueira, bassist Pedro Zappa and drummer Pepe Hidalgo.

The band released their self-titled debut album "Stone Giant" in 2015.

Biography

Early career (2012–2014) 
Sebastian Fernandez and João Nogueira met during their first day at Berklee College of Music in 2012. After many changes, the lineup was solidified as Sebastian Fernandez (guitar and vocals), João Nogueira (keys), Pepe Hidalgo (Drums), Pedro Zappa (Bass). The band rehearsed daily to find their sound. Since then, they have played live at Boston and New York in big venues and festivals, including at Fenway Park. On May 9, 2014, Stone Giant were chosen to play at a concert at Boston University in Agganis Arena. The band covered "The Ocean" by Led Zeppelin to honor guitarist Jimmy Page, who was in attendance.

Stone Giant (2015–present) 
Once the band found their complete sound and style, on November 2014 they decided to enter the studio "Water Music" at Hoboken, New Jersey, where they stayed for two weeks to record their debut album "Stone Giant". The album was self-produced by the band, with the collaboration of the Grammy Award Winner engineer, Fernando Lodeiro, as the co-producer and engineer. The full recording of the album was filmed as a documental by the director Nicolas Fernandez and is meant to be released in the future.

On early 2015, their manager Nicolas Boskis, took Stone Giant to London, UK, where they mastered their album at the famous "Abbey Road Studios" with the mastering engineer Alex Wharton. Stone Giant started to present the album on the "Get In The Groove tour" since September 2015, in USA where they will be playing at Washington, Nashville, Savannah, Pennsylvania, Boston, New York City, and many others.

In March 2016, the band played at Lollapalooza Festival in Argentina and Chile.

In an interview with Rocknvivo they said they want to continue playing live promoting their album, and are planning another tour in the US — where Lollapalooza Chicago could be a destination.

On June 6, 2017, the band announced through their official Facebook page that they were working on a new album.

On December 15, 2017, Stone Giant will be present at the Festival BUE in Buenos Aires, Argentina.

Band members

Current members
 Sebastian Fernandez – guitar, vocals
 João Nogueira – keyboards
 Pepe Hidalgo - drums
 Apoena Frota - bass

Former members
 Alejandro Enriquez Tarride - drums
 Pedro Zappa - bass

Discography

Studio albums and EPs 
Nasty Creatures EP (2018)
Stone Giant (2015)

References

Musical groups from Boston
Musical groups established in 2013
Hard rock musical groups from Massachusetts
2013 establishments in Massachusetts